Chal Betan (also Romanized as Chāl Betān and Chalbatan) is a village in Milas Rural District, in the Central District of Lordegan County, Chaharmahal and Bakhtiari Province, Iran. At the 2006 census, its population was 354, in 74 families.

References 

Populated places in Lordegan County